There are 1,946 listed buildings in Birmingham, England. This list by district includes those of Grade I and Grade II* importance, plus a selection of those of Grade II importance that are otherwise noteworthy. It also includes the Scheduled Ancient Monuments in the city (indicated by the letters AM).

As of April 2006 there are 23 Grade I, 95 Grade II*, 1,828 Grade II, and 13 Scheduled Ancient Monuments.



See also
Grade I listed buildings in the West Midlands#Birmingham
Grade II* listed buildings in the West Midlands#Birmingham
Listed pubs in Birmingham

References
Foster, Andy. Pevsner Architectural Guides: Birmingham. Yale University Press: New Haven & London, 2005 
Consolidated List of Statutorily Listed Buildings - Birmingham (full list in PDF format) - Birmingham City Council
The Victorian Society - Birmingham & West Midlands Group

 

Birmingham
Birmingham